"How You Gonna Act Like That" is a song by American singer Tyrese from his third studio album I Wanna Go There (2002). It was written by Gibson, Eric Dawkins, longtime contributors Harvey Mason Jr. and Damon Thomas and Polynesian artist George Veikoso (Fiji), while production was helmed by Mason and Thomas under their production moniker The Underdogs. Released as the album's lead single, the song peaked at number seven on the US Billboard Hot 100 and number three on the US Hot R&B/Hip-Hop Songs.

Track listings

Credits and personnel
 Eric Dawkins – writer
 George Veikoso (FIJI) - writer 
 Tyrese Gibson – vocals, writer
 Eric Jackson – guitar
 Jolie Levine-Aller – coordinator 
 Harvey Mason Jr. – producer, writer
 Eric Holder
 Dave "Natural Love" Russell – mixing
 [The Underdogs (production team)|Damon Thomas] – producer, writer

Charts

Weekly charts

Year-end charts

References

Tyrese Gibson songs
2003 songs
Song recordings produced by the Underdogs (production team)
Songs written by Damon Thomas (record producer)
RCA Records singles
Songs written by Harvey Mason Jr.
Songs written by Tyrese Gibson
Songs written by Eric Dawkins
Contemporary R&B ballads
2000s ballads